Lawrence Golan (born 1966) is an American orchestral conductor and violinist. He is the Music Director of the Denver Philharmonic Orchestra in Colorado, the Yakima Symphony Orchestra in Washington state, the York Symphony Orchestra in Pennsylvania, and the Lamont Symphony Orchestra and Opera Theatre at the University of Denver where he is director of orchestral studies and professor of conducting at the Lamont School of Music.

Life and career
Golan was born and raised in Chicago, Illinois where his father, Joseph Golan (1930-2011), was for 49 years a member of, and for 35 years principal second violinist of the Chicago Symphony Orchestra. He  received his Bachelor of Music and Master of Music degrees from the Jacobs School of Music at Indiana University, and went on to complete his Doctorate in music in 1995 at the New England Conservatory with a dissertation entitled Performing Bach: dotted rhythms and trills in the sonatas and partitas for solo violin. He furthered his studies in conducting at several music festivals including Aspen and Tanglewood, where in 1999 he was awarded the Leonard Bernstein conducting fellowship. Previous positions that Golan held include principal second violinist of the Honolulu Symphony Orchestra, concertmaster of the Portland Symphony Orchestra, orchestra conductor and director of string studies at the University of Southern Maine, music director of the Portland Ballet Company, artistic director of the Atlantic Chamber Orchestra, music director of the Colorado Youth Symphony Orchestras, conductor of the Phoenix Youth Symphony, resident conductor of the Phoenix Symphony, and principal conductor of the New Seoul Philharmonic Orchestra in South Korea.

In 2001, he joined the faculty of the University of Denver's Lamont School of Music as director of orchestral studies and professor of conducting and also to serve as music director and conductor of the Lamont Symphony Orchestra and Opera Theatre. He concurrently serves as music director of the Yakima Symphony Orchestra (appointed 2010), the Denver Philharmonic Orchestra (appointed 2013), and the York Symphony Orchestra (appointed 2014).

In 2011, Golan was the lead plaintiff of the United States Supreme Court case, now known as Golan v. Holder, which challenged the constitutionality of the application of Section 514 of the Uruguay Round Agreements Act. In the United States, the Act restored copyright status to foreign works (including musical compositions) previously in the public domain.

Awards 
Golan's awards include:
Multiple ASCAP Awards for Innovative Programming of Contemporary Music for his work with the Lamont Symphony Orchestra and the Yakima Symphony Orchestra (2004-2014)
Global Music Awards for his recording of  Indian Summer: The Music of George Perlman
Down Beat Magazine Awards for Best College Symphony Orchestra (Lamont Symphony Orchestra)
Prestige Music Awards (2012) for his recording of Tchaikovsky 6 and Tchaikovsky 6.1
American Prize Awards in conducting and programming (2012, Grand Prize Winner) Recordings Beethoven 7 & Beethoven 7.1, Lamont Symphony Orchestra conducted by Lawrence Golan. 2011, Albany RecordsTchaikovsky 6 & Tchaikovsky 6.1, Moravian Philharmonic conducted by Lawrence Golan. 2008, Albany RecordsFunky Little Crustaceans, William Hill, composer, Moravian Philharmonic, Lawrence Golan, conductor. 2007, Albany RecordsVisions, Dreams & Memories, works for Native American flute and orchestra featuring James Pellerite and the Moravian Philharmonic conducted by Lawrence Golan. 2006, Albany Records.Indian Summer: The Music of George Perlman. Lawrence Golan, violin; Martin Perry, piano. 1997, Albany RecordsFantasia, Lawrence Golan, violin. 1995, Entrata Records.

 Publications Bach: Three Sonatas and Three Partitas for Solo Violin (Book) BWV 1001-1006 by Lawrence Golan. 2006, Mel Bay PublicationsTchaikovsky's Nutcracker Ballet, edited and reduced orchestration by Lawrence Golan. 2003, Spurwink River PublishingLawrence Golan Violin Scale System. 1997, Mel Bay Publications.Fantasia for Solo Violin'' by Lawrence Golan. 1997, Ludwig Music Publishers

References

External links
 
Faculty biography, University of Denver

1966 births
Living people
American male conductors (music)
American classical violinists
Male classical violinists
American male violinists
Aspen Music Festival and School alumni
University of Denver faculty
New England Conservatory alumni
Jacobs School of Music alumni
21st-century American conductors (music)
21st-century classical violinists
21st-century American male musicians
21st-century American violinists